Why Not Productions is a public French film production company founded by producers Pascal Caucheteux and Grégoire Sorlat in 1990.  Its main focus is French auteur cinema, but it also co-produces films from other countries. Some of the filmmakers associated with the company are Arnaud Desplechin, Jacques Audiard, Xavier Beauvois and Ken Loach. As of 2011, the films had an average budget of five to six million euros.

Selected filmography
 In the Soup (1992), directed by Alexandre Rockwell
 The Sentinel (La sentinelle) (1992), directed by Arnaud Desplechin
 The Birth of Love (La naissance de l'amour) (1993), directed by Philippe Garrel
 Don't Forget You're Going to Die (N'oublie pas que tu vas mourir) (1995), directed by Xavier Beauvois
 My Sex Life... or How I Got into an Argument (Comment je me suis disputé... (ma vie sexuelle)) (1996), directed by Arnaud Desplechin
 Louis & Frank (1998), directed by Alexandre Rockwell
 Wild Innocence (Sauvage innocence) (2001), directed by Philippe Garrel
 The Perfume of the Lady in Black (2005), directed by Bruno Podalydès
 Assault on Precinct 13 (2005), directed by Jean-François Richet
 The Beat That My Heart Skipped (De battre mon coeur s'est arrêté) (2005), directed by Jacques Audiard
 Kings and Queen (Rois et reine) (2005), directed by Arnaud Desplechin
 The Young Lieutenant (Le petit lieutenant) (2005), directed by Xavier Beauvois
 A Christmas Tale (Un conte de Noël), directed by Arnaud Desplechin
 Looking for Eric (2009), directed by Ken Loach
 A Prophet (Un prophète) (2009), directed by Jacques Audiard
 Tales from the Golden Age (Amintiri din epoca de aur) (2009), directed by Hanno Höfer, Cristian Mungiu, Constantin Popescu, Ioana Uricaru, and Răzvan Marculescu
 White Material (2009), directed by Claire Denis
 Of Gods and Men (Des hommes et des dieux) (2010), directed by Xavier Beauvois
 Beloved (Les bien-aimés) (2011), directed by Christophe Honoré
 The Angels' Share (2012), directed by Ken Loach
 Beyond the Hills (După dealuri) (2012), directed by Cristian Mungiu
 Rust and Bone (De rouille et d'os) (2012), directed by Jacques Audiard
 Jimmy's Hall (2014), directed by Ken Loach
 The Price of Fame (La rançon de la gloire) (2014), directed by Xavier Beauvois
Comme un avion (2015), directed by Bruno Podalydés
Dheepan (2015), directed by Jacques Audiard
 My Golden Years (Trois souvenirs de ma jeunesse) (2015), directed by Arnaud Desplechin
 I, Daniel Blake (2016), directed by Ken Loach
 The Red Turtle (2016), directed by Michaël Dudok de Wit
 Bécassine (2018), directed by Bruno Podalydès
 The Sisters Brothers (2018), directed by Jacques Audiard
 A Faithful Man (2018) directed by Louis Garrel
 DNA (2020) directed by Maïwenn
 Deception (2021) directed by Arnaud Desplechin
 The Crusade (2021) directed by Louis Garrel
 Brother and Sister (2022) directed by Arnaud Desplechin
 La Favorite (2023) directed by Maïwenn

References

External links
 Official website 

Film production companies of France
Entertainment companies established in 1990
French companies established in 1990